The British International School Bratislava (BISB), established in 1997, is one of the oldest international schools in Slovakia. The school educates over 770 students between the ages of 3 and 18 years from over 45 countries. BISB educates children at pre-school, primary and secondary level and it is located in Dubravka. The school follows a curriculum based on the National Curriculum of England, International General Certificate in Secondary Education (IGCSE) and the Baccalaureate Diploma Program (IBDP).

The language of instruction is English. At the age of seven, students can choose a second foreign language (German, French or Spanish). Slovak and Korean nationals can study their mother tongues during the curriculum time. The school is accredited be the Ministry of Education of the Slovak Republic, Cambridge Examinations Board and International Baccalaureate Organisation.

Campus and location 
The school has three campuses: Nursery at Dolinskeho 1, Early Years Centre at Peknikova 4, Primary and Secondary School (main building) at Peknikova 6.

Nord Anglia Education 
The BISB is a part of Nord Anglia Education (NAE). This family of schools consists of over 80 international schools located in China, Europe, the Middle East, Southeast Asia and the Americas. Together, they educate more than 67,000 students from kindergarten through to the end of secondary education.

Accreditations
 The Ministry of Education, Science, Research and Sport of the Slovak Republic since 1997.
 Cambridge  Examinations Board 
 International Baccalaureate Organisation 
 Council of British International Schools

Curriculum 
The school provides a nursery, early years, primary and secondary school education. The curriculum in nursery to year 9 is based on the National Curriculum of England and Wales. Students then complete the two-year IGCSE programme in years 10 and 11, followed by the IB Diploma programme in years 12 and 13.

References

International schools in Slovakia
Schools in Bratislava
Bratislava
Educational institutions established in 1997
Nord Anglia Education
1997 establishments in Slovakia